Gymnopilus liquiritiae is a mushroom in the family Hymenogastraceae.  The mushroom is widely distributed and grows in dense clusters on dead conifer wood. It has a rusty orange spore print, a bitter taste, and does not contain the hallucinogen psilocybin.  One of its key distinguishing features is the lack of partial veil.

Description
Cap: 2–8 cm in diameter; initially convex, becoming nearly plane to nearly umbonate in age, dry, smooth, rusty brown to orange color, margin even, at length striatulate (with marked by small lines, grooves or ridges), cracking slightly in age, flesh pale yellow to pale orange.
Gills: Close to crowded; broad, edges fimbriate, yellowish or pale orange, eventually orange; sometimes with reddish brown spots.
Spore print: Rusty orange.
Stipe: 3–7 cm long; 3—8 mm thick; more or less equal, or tapering in either direction; sometimes slightly, even to off-center; smooth or finely fibrous; whitish to pale orange; yellowish or rusty colored mycelium at the base of the stalk. No partial veil.
Taste: Bitter
Odor: Mild or sometimes like raw potatoes
Microscopic features: Spores 7—8.5 x 4—5.5 μm, elliptical; pleurocystidia (inconspicuous), cheilocystidia, pileocystidia and caulocystidia present.

Habitat and formation
Gymnopilus liquiritiae is a widely distributed wood rotting mushroom, subcaespitose on conifer, seems to prefer dead hardwood in the southern regions.

See also

List of Gymnopilus species

References

External links
Index Fungorum Synonyms
Mushroom Expert - Gymnopilus liquiritiae
Gymnopilus liquiritiae information
Pacific Northwest Fungi Database

liquiritiae
Fungi of North America